Towle Silversmiths is an American silver manufacturer.

Towle Silversmiths was originally founded in 1857 as Towle & Jones by Anthony Francis Towle and William P. Jones, two apprentices to the Moulton family of silversmiths. In 1873 it became A.F. Towle & Son, and then in 1882, Anthony Francis Towle, while still owning A.F. Towle & Son, established the Towle Manufacturing Co. In 1890, the company adopted the trademark of a large script "T" enclosing a lion.  Richard Dimes, an English silversmith who had immigrated to the U.S. in 1881, started Towle's hollowware line. Dimes, who also worked for the Frank W. Smith Silver Co., would eventually establish his own company, Richard Dimes Co., in Boston. Eventually the company's name was changed to Towle Silversmiths.

Over the years, Towle has created numerous sterling silver flatware patterns in the United States: including the "Candlelight" in 1934, the "Marie Louise" in 1939 which became the official sterling silver pattern for U.S. embassies worldwide, "Old Master" in 1942, now considered by some to be the company’s flagship pattern, and the "Contour" in 1950 (designed by Robert J. King, patented by John Van Koert) which was the first American sterling pattern to manifest post-World War II organic modernist design and the only production-line American flatware included in the Museum of Modern Art's Good Design exhibitions.

In 1990, Towle Silversmiths was acquired by the holding company Syratech Inc., that also owned Wallace Silversmiths and the International Silver Company In 2006, Lifetime Brands Inc. purchased Syratech Inc., thereby acquiring all three brands.

References

External links
 Dead Link: Towle Silversmiths
Scientific American, "Hamilton E. Towle", 29-Oct-1881, pp.272

American silversmiths
Companies based in Massachusetts
Cutlery brands